The 1936–37 British Ice Hockey season featured the English National League and Scottish League.

English National League

English National Tournament

Results
First round
Wembley Lions - Richmond Hawks 7:4, 2:3
Brighton Tigers - Harringay Racers 5:2, 7:4
Earls Court Rangers - Southampton Vikings 8:6, 3:3
Harringay Greyhounds - Wembley Monarchs 1:3, 3:0
Manchester Rapids - Earls Court Royals 9:6, 3:4
Streatham - bye
Second round
Earls Court Rangers - Wembley Lions 8:4, 0:2
Streatham - Brighton Tigers 3:3, 4:3
Harringay Greyhounds and Manchester Rapids - bye
Semifinals
Earls Court Rangers - Streatham 6:4, 4:2
Harringay Greyhounds - Manchester Rapids 3:4, 2:2
Final
Earls Court Rangers - Manchester Rapids 3:1, 2:2

London Cup

Results

Scottish League
Glasgow Mohawks won the championship and received the Canada Cup.
Scores

(*Perth was awarded a forfeit victory as the Mustangs had been suspended.)

Table

Mitchell Trophy

Results

(*The Mustangs defaulted the second leg as they were incensed about the inclusion of Ronald Milne, who had also played in the first game, on the Lions roster. They refused to play the match with him again on the team and the Scottish Ice Hockey Association awarded the Mitchell Trophy to the Lions.

President's Pucks

Results

References 

British